Tom Mathisen (born 14 August 1952) is a Norwegian comedian, actor, screenwriter and musician. He usually handles bass, guitar and vocals. He was in the comedy group Prima Vera from 1976 to 1983 along with Jahn Teigen and Herodes Falsk. Later he continued to work with Herodes Falsk on many TV shows and records. He is also known as "Fortelleren" (The Narrator) in the Brødrene Dal series.

Performances 
In addition to solo appearances with guitar and vocals, Mathisen has performed in several groups:
Tom Mathisen & Herodes Falsk - vocals, guitar, bass
Prima Vera  - vocals, guitar, bass
Snu - vocals, bass, guitar, mandolin, harmonica
Viggo og Reidar - guitar, vocals and several other instruments
Credo Zeppo - vocals
Mulens Portland Combo - jazz guitar

References

1952 births
Living people
Norwegian male actors
Norwegian male comedians
Norwegian multi-instrumentalists
Norwegian screenwriters